Prairie Township is an inactive township in McDonald County, in the U.S. state of Missouri.

References

Townships in Missouri
Townships in McDonald County, Missouri